Géza Varasdi (6 February 1928 – May 2022) was a Hungarian athlete who mainly competed in the 100 metres. He was a member of the national team of Hungary between 1948 and 1956.

Biography
Born in Budapest, Hungary, Varasdi competed for Hungary at the 1952 Summer Olympics held in Helsinki, Finland, where he won the bronze medal in the men's 4 x 100 metre relay with his team mates László Zarándi, György Csányi and Béla Goldoványi. Together with the same team, he won the gold medal on 29 August 1954 in Bern, at the European Championship of Athletics in the men's 4 x 100 meter relay. When participating at the Olympic Games in Melbourne, 1956, he suffered a crick in his semifinal. From 1956 he lived in Melbourne, working as a doctor.

References

 
 
 

1928 births
2022 deaths
Hungarian male sprinters
Sportspeople from Budapest
Olympic bronze medalists for Hungary
Athletes (track and field) at the 1952 Summer Olympics
Athletes (track and field) at the 1956 Summer Olympics
Olympic athletes of Hungary
European Athletics Championships medalists
Medalists at the 1952 Summer Olympics
Olympic bronze medalists in athletics (track and field)